The 2010–11 IRB Sevens World Series was the 12th annual IRB Sevens World Series of rugby union sevens tournaments for full national sides run by the International Rugby Board since 1999–2000.

Sevens is traditionally played in a two-day tournament format. However, the most famous event, the Hong Kong Sevens, was played over three days, largely because it involved 24 teams instead of the normal 16.

Itinerary
The IRB announced dates for the 2010–11 events on 1 June 2010, only two days after the final event of the 2009–10 series, the Edinburgh Sevens. The stops remained unchanged from recent years; the only scheduling change for 2010–11 was that the Adelaide event, which moved from its traditional slot of one week after Hong Kong to one week before in 2010, returned to its prior slot for 2011.

This was the last season for the South Africa leg in George and the Australia leg in Adelaide. On 13 April 2011, both countries' national unions announced that their respective legs of the series would  move to new sites for 2011–12. The South Africa Sevens will move to Nelson Mandela Bay Stadium in Port Elizabeth. The Australia leg will move to Skilled Park in the Gold Coast; it was initially known as the "International Rugby Sevens Gold Coast", but later rebranded simply as the "Gold Coast Sevens".

Core teams
Before each season, the IRB announces the 12 "core teams" that received guaranteed berths in each event in that season's series. The core teams for 2010–11 were:

The core teams were unchanged from 2009–10.

Points schedule
The season championship was determined by points earned in each tournament. The points allocations for all events were identical to those in the 2009–10 series, reflecting changes that the IRB made starting with that season:

16-team events (all except for Hong Kong)
Cup winner (1st place): 24 points
Cup runner-up: 20 points
Losing Cup semifinalists: 16 points
Plate winner (5th place): 12 points
Plate runner-up: 8 points
Losing Plate semifinalists: 6 points
Bowl winner (9th place): 4 points

24-team event (Hong Kong)
Cup winner: 30 points
Cup runner-up: 25 points
Losing Cup semifinalists: 20 points
Plate winner (5th place): 16 points
Plate runner-up: 10 points
Losing Plate semifinalists: 8 points
Bowl winner (9th place): 5 points

Tournament structure
In all tournaments except Hong Kong, 16 teams participated. Due to its place as the sport's most prestigious annual event, the Hong Kong tournament had 24 teams. In each 16-team tournament, the teams were divided into pools of four teams, who played a round-robin within the pool. Points were awarded in each pool on a different schedule from most rugby tournaments—3 for a win, 2 for a draw, 1 for a loss. The first tiebreaker was the head-to-head result between the tied teams, followed by difference in points scored during the tournament.

Four trophies were awarded in each tournament. In descending order of prestige, they were the Cup, whose winner was the overall tournament champion, Plate, Bowl and Shield. The Shield was contested in Hong Kong for the first time in 2010. Each trophy was awarded at the end of a knockout tournament.

In a 16-team tournament, the top two teams in each pool advanced to the Cup competition. The four quarterfinal losers dropped into the bracket for the Plate. The Bowl was contested by the third- and fourth-place finishers in each pool, with the losers in the Bowl quarterfinals dropping into the bracket for the Shield.

The Hong Kong Sevens adopted a new structure effective with its 2010 edition. As in previous years, the 24 teams were divided into six pools of four teams each, with the competition points system and tiebreakers identical to those for a 16-team event. Also as in the past, the six pool winners and the two top second-place finishers advanced to the Cup competition.
 The Plate competition was contested by the losing quarterfinalists from the Cup, as in all other events in the series.
 The Bowl was contested by the four remaining second-place finishers and the top four third-place finishers.
 The Shield was contested by the remaining eight entrants.

Final standings
The points awarded to teams at each event, as well as the overall season totals, are shown in the table below. Points for the event winners are indicated in bold. A zero (0) is recorded in the event column where a team competed in a tournament but did not gain any points. A dash (–) is recorded in the event column if a team did not compete at a tournament.

{| class="wikitable sortable" style="text-align:center;"
|+ 2010–11 IRB Sevens – Series IX
! style="border-bottom:1px solid transparent;"|Pos.
! 
! style="vertical-align:top;width:5.5em;border-bottom:1px solid transparent;padding:2px;font-size:85%;"|Dubai
! style="vertical-align:top;width:5.5em;border-bottom:1px solid transparent;padding:2px;font-size:85%;"|George
! style="vertical-align:top;width:5.5em;border-bottom:1px solid transparent;padding:2px;font-size:85%;"|Wellington
! style="vertical-align:top;width:5.5em;border-bottom:1px solid transparent;padding:2px;font-size:85%;"|Las Vegas
! style="vertical-align:top;width:5.5em;border-bottom:1px solid transparent;padding:2px;font-size:85%;"|Hong Kong
! style="vertical-align:top;width:5.5em;border-bottom:1px solid transparent;padding:2px;font-size:85%;"|Adelaide
! style="vertical-align:top;width:5.5em;border-bottom:1px solid transparent;padding:2px;font-size:85%;"|London
! style="vertical-align:top;width:5.5em;border-bottom:1px solid transparent;padding:2px;font-size:85%;"|Edinburgh
! style="border-bottom:1px solid transparent;"|Pointstotal
|- style="line-height:8px;" 
! style="border-top:1px solid transparent;"|  !! style="border-top:1px solid transparent;"|
! data-sort-type="number" style="border-top:1px solid transparent;"| !! data-sort-type="number" style="border-top:1px solid transparent;"| 
! data-sort-type="number" style="border-top:1px solid transparent;"| !! data-sort-type="number" style="border-top:1px solid transparent;"| 
! data-sort-type="number" style="border-top:1px solid transparent;"| !! data-sort-type="number" style="border-top:1px solid transparent;"| 
! data-sort-type="number" style="border-top:1px solid transparent;"| !! data-sort-type="number" style="border-top:1px solid transparent;"| 
! data-sort-type="number" style="border-top:1px solid transparent;"|  
|-
|style="border-left:3px solid #7cf;"| 1 || align=left|
| 16 || 24 || 24 || 16 || 30||24 || 16 || 16 || 166
|-
|style="border-left:3px solid #7cf;"| 2 || align=left|
| 12 || 12 || 8 || 24 || 16 || 20 || 24 || 24 || 140
|-
|style="border-left:3px solid #7cf;"| 3 || align=left|
| 24 || 20 || 20 || 16 || 25 || 16 || 0 || 6 || 127
|-
|style="border-left:3px solid #7cf;"| 4 || align=left|
| 16 || 16 || 12 || 20 || 20 || 6 || 20 || 12 || 122
|-
|style="border-left:3px solid #7cf;"| 5 || align=left|
| 20 || 16 || 16 || 12 || 20 || 16 || 12 || 8 || 120
|-
|style="border-left:3px solid #7cf;"| 6 || align=left|
| 8 || 6 || 16 || 6 || 10 || 6 || 8 || 20 || 80
|-
|style="border-left:3px solid #7cf;"| 7 || align=left|
| 6 || 6 || 6 || 0 || 0 || 12 || 16 || 16 || 62
|-
|style="border-left:3px solid #7cf;"| 8 || align=left|
| 4 || 8 || 6 || 6 || 0 || 8 || 6 || 0 || 38
|-
|style="border-left:3px solid #7cf;"| 9 || align=left|
| 0 || 0 || 4 || 8 || 0 || 0 || 0 || 4 || 16
|-
|style="border-left:3px solid #7cf;"| 10 || align=left|
| 0 || 4 || 0 || 4 || 0 || 0 || 4 || 0 || 12
|-
|style="border-left:3px solid #7cf;"| 10 || align=left|
| 0 || 0 || 0 || 0 || 0 || 0 || 6 || 6 || 12
|-
|style="border-left:3px solid #7cf;"| 12 || align=left|
| 6 || 0 || 0 || 0 || 0 || 4 || 0 || 0 || 10
|-
| 13 || align=left| || 0 || 0 || – || – || 8 || – || 0 || 0 || 8
|-
| 13 || align=left| || 0 || 0 || – || – || 8 || – || 0 || 0 || 8
|-
| 15 || align=left| || – || – || 0 || 0 || 5 || – || 0 || 0 || 5
|}Notes:'''Light blue line on the left indicates a core team eligible to participate in all events of the series.''

Player scoring

Individual points

Individual tries

Tournaments

Dubai

South Africa

New Zealand

United States

Hong Kong

Australia

England

Scotland

References

External links
 IRB Sevens

 
World Rugby Sevens Series